Nevianipora is a genus of bryozoans belonging to the family Diaperoeciidae.

The genus has cosmopolitan distribution.

Species:

Nevianipora arcuata 
Nevianipora borgi 
Nevianipora fasciculata 
Nevianipora faxeensis 
Nevianipora floridana 
Nevianipora gasparensis 
Nevianipora interjuncta 
Nevianipora isfahani 
Nevianipora macgillivrayi 
Nevianipora milneana 
Nevianipora minor 
Nevianipora pedleyi 
Nevianipora pulcherrima 
Nevianipora pulcherrimoidea 
Nevianipora rugatata 
Nevianipora rugosa 
Nevianipora stoliczkai 
Nevianipora subgracilis

References

Bryozoan genera